Uganda Christian University (UCU) is a private church-founded university administered by the Church of Uganda. It was the first private University in Uganda to be awarded a charter by the Government of Uganda.

Location
The coordinates of the main campus are 0°21'27.0"N, 32°44'29.0"E (Latitude:0.357500; Longitude:32.741389).

Other regional campuses include UCU Mbale Campus, which is in Mbale, and UCU Arua Campus, which is in Arua. In 2019 construction of a permanent fifth campus in Kampala began, in the Mengo neighborhood, along Musajja Alumbwa Road.

Origins
UCU was founded in 1997 by the Anglican Church of Uganda from its premier theological seminary/college Bishop Tucker Theological College, which was established in 1913 and named after the pioneer missionary bishop Alfred Robert Tucker.

Chancellor
UCU's chancellor is the Archbishop of Uganda, currently Stephen Kaziimba, since March 2020. Te table below outlines the tenures of the chancellors of the university since its inception, in 1997.

Vice Chancellor
The first vice chancellor, Stephen Noll, was installed in 2000. He is an American Anglican priest, theologian, and missionary. He helped UCU to receive a government charter in 2004, the first of its kind in Uganda. Noll's term as vice chancellor ended in 2010.

John Senyonyi, an evangelist and mathematician, is the UCU's second vice chancellor. He joined UCU as a chaplain in 2001. He rose to become the deputy vice chancellor for finance and administration. Later, he became the first deputy vice chancellor in charge of development and external relations, the first such position in any Ugandan university.

On 1 September 2020, Aaron Mushengyezi, a linguist and former  dean of the department of languages, literature and communications at Makerere University, became the third Vice Chancellor at Uganda Christian University.

UCU today
While the majority of faculty and students are Ugandan, UCU has attracted students from other African Great Lakes countries and a number of expatriate staff from North America, Europe, Australia, and New Zealand. These international ties are in part historic through societies like the Church Mission Society and in part new ties formed among churches of the Anglican Communion.

Schools,Faculties and departments
As of March 2020, the university is divided into the following schools, faculties, and departments:

 Faculty of Law
 UCU School of Medicine
 Faculty of Social Sciences
 School of Education
 Faculty of Science and Technology
 School of Business
 Bishop Tucker School of Theology
 Faculty of Journalism, Media & Communication.

Library services 

UCU has two libraries based at the main campus; that is the Hamu Mukasa Library which serves as the main library and Bishop Tucker Library and branch libraries in all branch campuses and constituent colleges; that is to say;  in Mengo, Kampala, Mbale and Kabale Campuses. There is also an archival library based at the main campus.

Medical school
In March 2016, the Daily Monitor newspaper reported that UCU and Mengo Hospital were negotiating for the establishment of a UCU school of medicine at the hospital. No time-frame was disclosed.

On 26 February 2018, the Uganda National Council for Higher Education gave the university a letter of accreditation for three new medical courses (a) Bachelor of Medicine and Bachelor of Surgery, (b) Bachelor of Dental Surgery and (c) Bachelor of Public Health. The three courses will be offered at the Uganda Christian University School of Medicine, starting in August 2018.

Notable alumni

The Church
 Henry Luke Orombi, 7th Archbishop of the Church of Uganda, from 2004 until 2012.

Politics
Ronald Kibuule, Member of Parliament, Minister of State for Water Resources from June 2016 until May 2021
Evelyn Anite, Member of Parliament, Minister of State for Investment and Privatisation, since June 2016
Alengot Oromait, Member of Parliament for Usuk County, from 2012 until 2016.
Daniel Kidega, 4th Speaker of the East African Legislative Assembly.

Sports
Ivan Lumanyika, basketball player
 Peace Proscovia, professional netball player, captain on Uganda National Netball Team.

Others
Grace Akallo, human rights activist 
 Joel Okuyo Atiku, actor and model

Notable faculty
Stephen Noll, 1st Vice Chancellor of UCU, 2000-2010
John Ntambirweki formerly lectured in the Faculty of Law.
John Senyonyi, University Chaplain, 2001-2003. 2nd Vice Chancellor of UCU from 2010 to 2020. 
Keith Sutton, lecturer at the then Bishop Tucker Theological College, 1968-1973.
 Monica Balya Chibita, Professor & Dean, Faculty of Journalism, Media and Communication at Uganda Christian University.

See also
 Education in Uganda
 List of universities in Uganda
 Ugandan university leaders
Mukono 
Church of Uganda

References

External links 
  Uganda Christian University homepage
 UCU Celebrates 100 Years Since The Founding of Bishop Tucker Theological College In 1913
 The Standard - UCU's community newspaper
 All the breaking stories and Hostel Buzz from UCU

 
Mukono District
Anglican schools in Africa
Christian schools in Uganda
1997 establishments in Uganda
Educational institutions established in 1997